The Pinjara (Rajasthani: पिंज़ारा (Devanagari)  (Perso-Arabic), Kannada: ಪಿಂಜಾರ ) are a community found in the states of Madhya Pradesh, Maharashtra, Karnataka, Gujarat and Rajasthan in India. The terms Pinjara, Mansoori,  and Dhunia are used interchangeably in some regions of India whereas in other regions they are separate communities. They are also known as Mansoori, especially in Gujarat, where the name Pinjara is no longer used.

History and origin

The community originated from local converts to Islam and were involved in the traditional occupation of cotton ginning/trading. Some Pinjaras who originated from converts to Islam claim their descent from Rajput . According to history, they came from Rajasthan to Gujarat at the time of the form of Ran Singh and resided here. Even today, their main caste - Rao, Deora, Chauhan, Bhati, which is also a Rajput clan[2]. The main origin of this community from Afghanistan and some of whose converted Muslim from Rajput's.But they were called, Dhuna by the Hindu community and it's also mentioned that dhuna, was stated to the Hindu carder not for Muslims. Most of the people of this community used no surname until recent times however most of them have adopted surnames like Khan, Pathan while others use Mansoori as a surname because the famous Persian Sufi Mansoor Al Hallaj was also a weaver. Zayn Malik belong this Community.

See also
Ghanchi-Pinjara

References

Social groups of Rajasthan
Social groups of Maharashtra
Social groups of Madhya Pradesh
Social groups of Karnataka
Muslim communities of Rajasthan
Muslim communities of Madhya Pradesh
Muslim communities of Karnataka